Impellizzeri is an Italian surname. Notable people with the surname include:

Brian Lionel Impellizzeri (born 1998) Argentine Paralympic athlete
Charles Impellizzeri (died 1656), Italian Roman Catholic bishop
Nunzio Impellizzeri (born 1980), Italian choreographer
Shirley Impellizzeri, American clinical psychologist
Simone Impellizzeri (died 1701), Italian Roman Catholic bishop

Italian-language surnames